The .405 Winchester (also known as the .405 WCF) is a centerfire rifle cartridge introduced in 1904 for the Winchester 1895 lever-action rifle. It remains to this day one of the most powerful rimmed cartridge designed specifically for lever-action rifles; the only modern lever action cartridges that exceed its performance are the .50 Alaskan, .450 Alaskan, .475 Turnbull, .348 Turnbull and the .450 Marlin. The .405 was highly regarded by U.S. President Theodore Roosevelt during his safari in East Africa.

Description and Ballistics

The original Winchester factory load consisted of a 300gr. soft point or metal patch (Full Metal Jacket) bullet at 2200 feet per second. When the Winchester M1895 was discontinued in 1936, the cartridge was considered obsolete. Catalog listings of the cartridge ceased in 1955. However, during the 100-year anniversary of Theodore Roosevelt's presidential administration in 2001, Winchester reintroduced the M1895 in .405 Winchester, and revived the cartridge.

In addition to the Winchester Model 1895, the .405 Winchester was also available in the Winchester Model 1885 Single Shot Rifle, the Remington-Lee bolt-action rifle (from 1904 to 1906), and a number of British and European double rifles. The cartridge was also available in the Ruger No.1 Tropical single-shot rifle.

Winchester's advertising campaigns during the first decade of the twentieth century took full advantage of Theodore Roosevelt's frequent praise of the .405 Winchester, as well as the Winchester 1895 which chambered it. Roosevelt famously referred to this rifle as his "'medicine gun' for lions." This quote comes from Roosevelt's account of a lion hunt in the seventh chapter of his book African Game Trails (Scribner's Sons, 1910, page 167):
 But as we stood, one of the porters behind called out "Simba"; and we caught a glimpse of a big lioness galloping down beside the trees, just beyond the donga...Tarlton took his big double-barrel and advised me to take mine, as the sun had just set and it was likely to be close work; but I shook my head, for the Winchester 405 is, at least for me personally, the "medicine gun" for lions.

Since the .405 Winchester's introduction, many hunters have used it on African big game, including rhino and buffalo; however it is generally considered best used against light skinned game, due to the bullet's low sectional density. The velocity of the cartridge is also low by contemporary standards, which makes shooting at long range challenging due to the allowance the shooter must make for bullet drop.

Wildcats

The .277 Elliott Express and .357 Elliott Express are two of a series of wildcats developed by O.H. Elliott & Company of South Haven, Michigan, based on the .405 Winchester cartridge. This custom gunsmith manufactured his own rifle barrels.

Dimensions

See also
 List of Winchester Center Fire cartridges
 Table of handgun and rifle cartridges
 List of cartridges by caliber
 List of rifle cartridges
 10 mm caliber
 .40 S&W
 10mm Auto
 .41 Action Express

References

External links

 The .405 Winchester (by American Hunter)
 The .405 Winchester (by Chuck Hawks)
 .405 Winchester Ballistics
 .405 Winchester: Roosevelt's Medicine Gun For Lions
 

Pistol and rifle cartridges
Weapons and ammunition introduced in 1904
Winchester Repeating Arms Company cartridges
Rimmed cartridges